Zdzisław Podedworny (born 13 April 1941 in Żabińce) is a Polish football coach.

Career

Coaching career
He managed Górnik Zabrze, Olimpia Poznań, GKS Katowice, Ruch Chorzów, Espérance de Tunis, Polonia Warsaw, Stomil Olsztyn and TS Koszarawa 1910 Żywiec.

References

1941 births
Living people
Polish football managers
Górnik Zabrze managers
GKS Katowice managers
Ruch Chorzów managers
MKS Cracovia managers
Espérance Sportive de Tunis managers
Polonia Warsaw managers
Al-Rayyan SC managers
People from Ternopil Oblast
Polish expatriate football managers